Athanasius of Attalia was a Neomartyr who lived in Smyrna in the 17th century.  His feast day is celebrated on January 7.

Martyrdom
He was a poor and simple man, but was rich in faith. One day he was inadvertently involved in a religious dispute with a Turk. The Turk was educated and adroit with words, but Athanasius strove with all his might to uphold the truth of the Christian faith and its superiority over Islam. Finally, they parted.

On the next day, Athanasius was summoned to trial and met the Turk as his accuser. The judge called on Athanasius to repudiate Orthodoxy and accept Islam as he had given the impression of declaring to his companion of the previous day that he, Athanasius, said: "I would die a thousand deaths before I would deny the Faith of Christ!"

For this he was condemned to death and beheaded in the year 1700. His holy relics were buried in the Church of St. Paraskeva in Smyrna.

References

External links
New Martyr Athanasius of Attalia and Smyrna (1700)

Year of birth missing
1700 deaths
17th-century Eastern Orthodox martyrs
17th-century Christian saints
Christian saints killed by Muslims
Saints from Anatolia